Race is a 2013 Indian Telugu-language romance film directed by Ramesh Raparthi and produced by Anne Ravi, released on 1 March 2013.

Plot

Cast
Vikram Veer as Abhiram
Karthik as Chaitanya
Bharat Kishore as Sidharth
 Disha Pandey as Aarthi
Nikitha Narayan as Anjali
Srinivasa Reddy
Phani Eggone
Gundu Sudarshan
Fish Venkat

References

2010s Telugu-language films
2013 films
2013 romance films
Indian romance films